Étienne Vincent Arago (9 February 1802 – 7 March 1892) was a French writer and politician, and co-founder (with Maurice Alhoy) of the newspaper Le Figaro.

Early life

Arago was born in Perpignan, the youngest of the four Arago brothers. His parents were François Bonaventure Arago (1754–1814) and Marie Arago (1755–1845).  He entered the École Polytechnique but left due to involvement with the Carbonari.

Career

He pursued literary interests and was an acquaintance of Honoré de Balzac (they co-wrote an unsuccessful novel). In 1829, he became director of the Théâtre du Vaudeville; it closed in 1838, leaving him with considerable debts.

In February 1848, during the Revolution of that year, he became director of the national post office. He was active in political movements and opposed Napoleon III, and was in exile in Belgium from 1849 to 1859. He briefly served as mayor of Paris, for two months in 1870, during the Franco-Prussian War. Later, he was involved in a diplomatic mission to Italy.

Family

Arago's brothers included François (astronomer, physicist, politician); Jean, who emigrated to North America and became a general in the Mexican army; and Jacques Étienne Victor, who took part in Louis de Freycinet's exploring voyage in the ship Uranie from 1817 to 1821, and on his return to France devoted himself to his journalism and the drama.

References

External links
 
 
 Muriel Toulotte, Etienne Arago, 1802–1892: une vie, un siècle (Publications de l'Olivier, 1993)

1802 births
1892 deaths
People from Perpignan
Politicians from Occitania (administrative region)
The Mountain (1849) politicians
Members of the 1848 Constituent Assembly
Members of the National Assembly (1871)
Mayors of Paris
French newspaper founders
19th-century French dramatists and playwrights
Writers from Occitania (administrative region)
19th-century French journalists
French male journalists
19th-century French businesspeople
19th-century French male writers
Burials at Montparnasse Cemetery
Le Figaro people